The 1988 WTA Tour was the elite tour for professional women's tennis of the Women's International Tennis Association (WITA) for the 1988 season. The 1988 WTA Tour included the four Grand Slam tournaments, the WITA Tour Championships and the WTA Category 1-5 events. ITF tournaments were not part of the WTA Tour, although they award points for the WTA World Ranking.

The tour was governed by the Women's International Professional Tennis Council (WIPTC), a cooperation between WITA, ITF and recognized tournaments. Philip Morris sponsored the tour under its 
Virginia Slims brand.

Steffi Graf became the first singles player in history to win the Golden Slam by taking the Australian Open, French Open, Wimbledon and US Open singles titles, along with the Olympic gold medal. Graf's defeat by Pam Shriver in the semifinals of the Virginia Slims Championships deprived her of a Super Slam.

Schedule
The table below shows the 1988 WTA Tour schedule.

Key

December 1987

January

February

March

April

May

June

July

August

September

October

November

December

Statistical Information

Titles won by player
These tables present the number of singles (S), doubles (D), and mixed doubles (X) titles won by each player and each nation during the season, within all the tournament categories of the 1988 WTA Tour: the Grand Slam tournaments, the Year-end championships and regular WTA tour events. The players/nations are sorted by:

 total number of titles (a doubles title won by two players representing the same nation counts as only one win for the nation);
 highest amount of highest category tournaments (for example, having a single Grand Slam gives preference over any kind of combination without a Grand Slam title); 
 a singles > doubles > mixed doubles hierarchy; 
 alphabetical order (by family names for players).

Titles won by nation

Rankings
Below are the 1988 WTA year-end rankings (December 19, 1988) in both singles and doubles competition:

See also
 1988 Nabisco Grand Prix – men's circuit

References

 
WTA Tour
WTA Tour seasons